Sandro Rafael Veiga Cunha (born 30 April 1992) known as Rafinha, is a Portuguese footballer who plays for Rebordosa as a winger.

Football career
On 27 July 2013, Rafinha made his professional debut with Trofense in a 2013–14 Taça da Liga match against União Madeira, when he started and played the full game. In the first match of the  2013–14 Segunda Liga season against Benfica B on the 10 August, he replaced Paulo Monteiro (72nd minute) and made his league debut.

References

External links

Stats and profile at LPFP

Rafinha Cunha at ZeroZero

1992 births
People from Paços de Ferreira
Living people
Portuguese footballers
Association football midfielders
F.C. Paços de Ferreira players
G.D. Ribeirão players
F.C. Tirsense players
C.D. Trofense players
F.C. Vizela players
C.D. Aves players
F.C. Felgueiras 1932 players
Amarante F.C. players
Vitória F.C. players
Lusitânia F.C. players
Juventude de Pedras Salgadas players
Louletano D.C. players
Rebordosa A.C. players
Primeira Liga players
Liga Portugal 2 players
Campeonato de Portugal (league) players
Sportspeople from Porto District